Donnington is a village and civil parish near Ledbury.

Parish church 
The parish church is dedicated to Saint Mary.
Donnington Hall is located here on the outskirts of the village.

In 1870–72, Donnington was described as:

 "DONNINGTON, a parish in Ledbury district, Hereford; under the Malvern hills, at the boundary with Gloucester, 2¼ miles S of Ledbury town and r[ailway]. station. Post town, Ledbury. Acres, 808. Real property, £1, 566. Pop[ulation]., 105. Houses, 20. The property is divided among a few. The living is a rectory in the diocese of Hereford. Value, £209.* Patron, R. Webb, Esq. The church is old but good; and has a wooden tower."

References

External links

Villages in Herefordshire
Civil parishes in Herefordshire